Tabernaemontana oppositifolia is a species of plant in the family Apocynaceae. It is endemic to Puerto Rico.

References

oppositifolia
Endemic flora of Puerto Rico
Vulnerable plants
Taxonomy articles created by Polbot